is a Japanese composer, gagaku musician, and actor. His current label is Universal Music (transferred from Toshiba-EMI in 2007). Tōgi joined the Imperial Music Division in 1986 but had to quit in 2000 because of the hostile reaction to his popular compositions from fellow gagaku musicians.

Bibliography

Co-authored

Discography

CD albums

CD singles

Representative songs

Unpublished songs

Music in charge

Filmography

Documentaries

Language programmes

Dramas

Films

Advertisements

References

External links
 
 
 
 

Japanese male composers
Japanese male actors
Academic staff of Taisho University
Musicians from Tokyo
1959 births
Living people